Kim Won-sik  (born February 15, 1993), better known by his stage name Ravi, is a South Korean rapper, singer, songwriter, record producer, and founder of the record label Groovl1n and The L1VE. He is a member of the South Korean boy group VIXX and its sub-unit VIXX LR. He debuted as a solo artist on January 9, 2017, with the release of his debut mini album R.eal1ze.

Career

2012–2013: Debut and project solo activities

Ravi was one of ten trainees who were contestants on Mnet's survival reality show MyDOL. During his time on the show, Ravi featured in the music videos for Brian Joo's "Let This Die" and Seo In-guk's "Shake It Up". He eventually became one of six contestants chosen as the final line-up for a new boy group VIXX. VIXX debuted on May 24, 2012, on M! Countdown with the single "Super Hero", which Ravi co-wrote. On June 14 and 15, during "Super Hero" promotions, Ravi participated in Baek Ji-young's performances of her song "Good Boy".

In 2013, he appeared in episode four of SBS's television drama The Heirs alongside his group members.

2014–2015: Collaborations and VIXX LR

In 2014, Ravi collaborated with American artist Chad Future with "Rock the World" from Future's first mini album. Ravi also appeared in the music video for the single.

In 2015, after much deliberation, Ravi became a contestant of Mnet's television rap competition series Show Me the Money 4 but was eliminated in the second round. Ravi was featured as a rapper in Rain's Chinese song "Diamond Love" from the soundtrack of the Chinese drama Diamond Lover (克拉戀人).

On August 7, 2015, Jellyfish Entertainment released a video trailer on VIXX's official website after a mysterious countdown with a silhouette of VIXX's last special album Boys' Record. As time went by, members of VIXX disappeared until finally only Leo and Ravi were left behind, which caused fans to speculate that it meant another comeback for all six members. A video trailer of VIXX LR was then revealed.

VIXX LR was confirmed by Jellyfish Entertainment to be VIXX's first official sub-unit composed of main rapper Ravi and main vocalist Leo. Their debut mini album, Beautiful Liar, was released on August 17, 2015. On the same day VIXX LR held their first showcase for Beautiful Liar at Yes24 Muv Hall in Seoul′s Mapo-gu.

In December 2015, Ravi was featured in the ballad girl group Melody Day's single "When It Rains", as part of their Winter Ballad Project.

On December 31, 2015, Ravi dropped a teaser on his Twitter and Instagram accounts for his first mixtape R.ebirth with tracks composed, written and produced by himself.

2016–2019: R.ebirth , DamnRa, solo debut with R.eal1ze, Nirvana, and R.ook Book
On January 4, 2016, Ravi revealed the first pre-release to his mixtape R.ebirth, with the track "Where Should I Go" featuring Microdot. The second pre-release "OX" featuring Basick, the winner of Show Me the Money 4, was released on January 20, 2016. The third pre-release "Good Girls" featuring Hanhae and Soulman was released on February 4, 2016. The fourth and final pre-release "Move" was released on February 22, 2016. All the  mixtape  pre-releases have been released on VIXX's official YouTube channel and on Ravi's official SoundCloud. On March 4, 2016 the track list was revealed on Ravi's Instagram. The full version of R.ebirth was released on March 12, 2016 available for free as streaming media also on SoundCloud and YouTube. To celebrate the release of R.ebirth, Ravi held a showcase, titled Ravi's 1st Live Party [R.EBIRTH], on March 19 and March 20, 2016 at the Hyundai Card Understage in Seoul. Rappers Basick, Esbee, and DJ/producer SAM&SP3CK attended the show as featured performers and VIXX members Leo, N, Ken, Hongbin and Hyuk also attended as guests.

On July 14, 2016, Ravi participated in Jellyfish Entertainment's new music channel project Jelly Box and released the single "DamnRa" featuring SAM&SP3CK, a DJ/producer duo. "DamnRa" was released along with a performance music video. On September 26, Ravi released a mixtape track titled "Who are U" and featuring Superbee.

As of October 2016 with the release of Kratos, Ravi has contributed to the writing and composing of over 46 songs recorded by VIXX.

On December 26, 2016, it was announced that Ravi would debut as a solo artist with a mini album titled R.eal1ze on January 9, 2017 and will hold a solo concert from January 6 to January 8 at the Yes24 Muv Hall in Seoul's Mapo District.

On January 4, 2017, Ravi pre-released a single, "Home Alone" featuring Jung Yong-hwa from his upcoming first mini album R.eal1ze.

On January 9, 2017, Ravi released his debut mini album R.eal1ze, which contains three tracks from his previous mixtape plus four new tracks including the title track “Bomb” featuring San E. He was the producer, and personally in charge of the composition, arrangement and writing the lyrics of every song.

On February 7, 2019, Ravi and Chungha confirmed that they will release their collaboration on February 18. On the promised day the new single Live was released on various music streaming websites.

On February 22, 2019, Ravi's second mini album R.ook Book was announced to be released on March 5.

During March, Ravi appeared in several music programs performing "Runway" and "Tuxedo".

Ravi had his third solo concert REAL-LIVE R.OOK BOOK which took place at the Yes24 Live Hall in Seoul on March 22–24.

On November 8, 2019, Ravi released the first part of his third mini album Limitless.  The second part of the album was released on November 23.

2020–present: El Dorado, Paradise, Roses and Love&Fight
On February 24, 2020, Ravi released his first studio album El Dorado, with "Rockstar" as the title track.
On July 28, 2020, Ravi released his summer mini album Paradise, along with the title track of the same name featuring Ha Sung-woon.

On June 3, 2021, Ravi released his fourth mini album Roses, along with the title tracks "Flower Garden" and "Cardigan".

On February 8, 2022, Ravi released his second studio album Love&Fight, with "Winner" as the title track featuring Ash Island.

On February 21, 2022, Ravi's agency confirmed that his concerts in February were temporarily postponed due to the spread of the coronavirus.

In April 2022, Ravi announced that he would resume concerts on May 7 and 8, 2022.

After appearing as a regular cast member for 2 years and 4 months, Ravi departed from KBS variety show 2 Days & 1 Night, in order to prepare for his upcoming military enlistment. His last episode aired on May 1, 2022 and he released a single titled "Who We Are" on the same day as a farewell song.

On August 11, 2022, it was announced that Ravi would release a teaser image of Ravi's new single album 'BYE'.

On September 5, 2022, it was announced that Ravi will release the EP album "Love & Holiday", which will be released on September 12.

On October 6, 2022, they released their new single "Fashionable Dance", which will be released on October 13.

Groovl1n
On June 27, 2019, Ravi revealed via his Twitter and Instagram account the name of his own hip-hop label name Groovl1n a combination of Groove and Goblin which means "The cool folk of the orient".
At that time, the label includes Cold Bay, Chillin Homie and Xydo (Park Chi Woong) whom he worked with in the past. Currently, Korean rappers JUSTHIS, NAFLA and PRIMEKINGZ dance crew are included.

The L1ve
On July 20, 2021, Ravi established his new label, The L1ve.  The label aims to support music artists across different genres.

On July 22, 2021, Ailee announced that she would be joining the new label, as their first official artist. On August 31, 2021, it was revealed that Wheein signed an exclusive contract with the agency.

Personal life

Military service 
On October 7, 2022, Ravi's agency announced that he will enlist for his mandatory military service on October 27. After completing basic training he will complete his service as a social worker.

Suspicion of involvement in the 2022 epilepsy military service corruption case 
On January 12, 2023, two military service recruiters a day questioned by prosecutors were arrested and charged, Later from the investigation that Ravi's name is one of the clients who have been consulted Later, the reporter contacted the agency, which at first could not be contacted, later the agency quickly announced that it was appropriate to express would position, But because the relevant content is related to the duty of defense of the country. It seems to be our duty to first understand the details and then explain them in detail. So we are now. In the process of finding out the details" if requested about the case. We will conduct a diligent investigation at any time.” 

After that, investigators found the result of Ravi's military service examination found on the mobile phone of Mr. Gu, one of the military recruiters.

On February 10, 2023, the agency confirmed that Ravi has never been summoned to investigate by the prosecutor for conscription evasion. If there is a summons to enter Ravi is willing to cooperate fully.

On March 7, 2022, the judge in charge of the case interviewed the media Before issuing an arrest warrant because Ravi asked to come in and talk to himself. The court, therefore, canceled the arrest warrant for this case because Ravi had already received all the allegations and did not seem to flee or destroy the evidence.

On March 13, 2023, at a press conference held at the Seoul Southern District Prosecutor's Office and the Military Personnel Bureau on the morning of March 13, the Seoul Southern District Prosecutor's Office and the Joint Investigation Team of the Military Personnel Bureau found 109 people, Five government officials, 21 accomplices, and two military recruiters total 137 accused, As a result, Ravi was charged with violating the Military Service Act.

Discography

Studio albums

Extended plays

Mixtapes

Singles

Notes

Concerts

Headlining
 2016: Ravi's 1st Live Party [R.EBIRTH]
 2017: RAVI 1st REAL-LIVE [R.EAL1ZE]
 2018: RAVI 2nd REAL-LIVE NIRVANA
 2018: RAVI 1st SOLO EUROPE TOUR
 2019: RAVI 3rd REAL-LIVE R.OOK BOOK
 2022: RAVI REVOIR Concert

Co-headlining
 2017: Rapbeat Show 2017 in Australia

Filmography

Television

Awards and nominations

References

External links

Jellyfish Entertainment artists
VIXX members
Japanese-language singers of South Korea
South Korean dance music singers
South Korean male idols
South Korean pop singers
South Korean male singers
South Korean songwriters
South Korean male rappers
People from Seoul
Musicians from Seoul
1993 births
Living people
Howon University alumni
Show Me the Money (South Korean TV series) contestants
21st-century South Korean singers
Rappers from Seoul
South Korean hip hop record producers
South Korean television personalities